BEML Limited, formerly Bharat Earth Movers Limited, is an Indian public sector undertaking which manufactures a variety of heavy equipment, such as that used for earth moving, railways, transport and mining. It is headquartered in Bangalore. BEML is Asia's second-largest manufacturer of earth moving equipment. Its stock trades on the National Stock Exchange of India under the symbol "BEML", and on the Bombay Stock Exchange under the code "500048".

History
BEML incorporated in 11th May 1964, with the help of the Soviet Union. It was wholly owned by the government and operated by India's Ministry of Defence until 1992, when the government divested 25% of its holdings in the company. The company went for Follow-on Public offer (FPO) and fixed the price band for its FPO between ₹1,020 and ₹1,090. The Government of India had given 'in-principle' approval for strategic disinvestment of BEML Ltd. to the extent of 26% out of the Government shareholding of 54.03% with transfer of management control to strategic buyer.

Manufacturing facilities
BEML has manufacturing plants in Kolar Gold Fields, Bangalore, Mysore and Palakkad. It has numerous regional offices throughout the country. KGF unit is the main unit accounting for the manufacture and assembly of a wide array of earth-moving equipment such as bulldozers and excavators. Railcoaches are made in the Bengaluru complex, and the Mysore facility makes dump trucks and engines of various capacity. On 10 August 2020, Defence Minister Rajnath Singh inaugurated the industrial design centre (IDC) at BEML Bengaluru, aiming to integrate research and development with manufacturing.

Products
BEML manufactures a wide range of products to meet the needs of mining, construction, power, irrigation, fertiliser, cement, steel and rail sectors. The earthmoving equipment includes bulldozers, dump trucks, hydraulic excavators, wheel loaders, rope shovels, walking draglines, motor graders and scrapers.

BEML has recently introduced road headers and slide discharge Loaders for underground mining applications. Railway products include integral railcoaches, electric multiple units, rail buses, track-laying equipment and overhead equipment inspection Cars. BEML manufactures heavy-duty trucks and trailers and hydraulic aggregates for the transportation sector.

The company also manufactures high power diesel engines and heavy duty hydraulic aggregates to meet specific customer requirements. The company plans to diversify into varied activities including underground mining equipment, underground storage for petro-products, leasing and financial services and joint ventures abroad.

Mining & Construction equipment
BEML is India's leading mining & construction equipment manufacturer and Asia's second largest equipment company,
BEML offers diverse range of mining machinery for both opencast and underground mining.

BEML manufactures machines such as Hydraulic Excavators, Bulldozers, Wheel loaders, Dump Trucks, Motor Grades, Pipe Layers, Tyre handler, Backhoe Loaders, Electric Shovels, Load Haul Dumpers etc.

Defense & Aerospace
BEML plays a key role in the country's Integrated Guided Missile Development Project by supplying ground support vehicle.
A new Aerospace division was launched during Aero India 2009.The division manufactures Ground support equipment such as Aircraft Towing Tractor, Aircraft Weapon Loading Trolley, Multi-purpose Weapon Loaders and Crash Fire Tender.

Railways/Metro rolling stock

BEML Limited's Rail Coach Factory situated in Bangalore, India is the first all steel integrated rail coach factory established by Government of India during 1948.This factory was established to indigenously manufacture the passenger rail coach for Indian Railways.
 
BEML manufactures rolling stock for Indian Railways as well as for metros since 1980's. BEML has supplied more than 200 coaches to DMRC and has an order of 150 coaches from Bengaluru Metro. BEML has independently supplied about 140 cars to DMRC using transfer of technology from Hyundai ROTEM. Jaipur Metro has also ordered to manufacture, supply, test and commission 10 train sets of four cars each, totaling 40 cars to the Jaipur Metro Project.

BEML has started supplying metro train sets to the East West corridor of Kolkata Metro (KMRCL). Present order in hands from KMRCL is for 14 train sets of six cars each.

BEML is one of the leading manufacturers of rail and metro coaches. Metro systems using BEML rolling stock are:

 Delhi Metro (Pink Line) - more than 500 coaches
 Namma Metro - 150 coaches
 Jaipur Metro - 40 coaches

 Kolkata Metro (Line 2) - 84 coaches
 Mumbai Metro - 378 coaches (Line 2 and 7)

Infrastructure 

BEML operates in three major business verticals associated with equipment manufacturing:

 Mining & Construction
 Defence & Aerospace
 Rail & Metro

In addition to the above, there are strategic business units (SBUs):

 Trading Division for dealing in non-company products
 International Business Division for export activities
 Aerospace Division for design services for the aviation sector

BEML has the following manufacturing units spread over four locations:

 Kolar Gold Fields (KGF) Complex (around 100 km from Bengaluru)
 hebi Earth Moving Division
 Rail Coach Unit II
 Heavy Fabrication Unit
 Hydraulic & Powerline Division
 Mysore Complex (around 130 km from Bengaluru)
 Truck Division
 Engine Division
 Aerospace Manufacturing Division
 Bengaluru Complex - Rail & Metro Division
Palakkad Complex Kerala State - defence products manufacturing
BEML - Tatra Trucks 12x12, 10x10, 8x8, 6x6, 4x4 & variants
Pontoon bridge system
Ground support vehicles for guided missile programme
Heavy, medium and light recovery vehicles
50T trailer for tank transportation
Mil rail coaches and mil wagons
Apart from the above, Railway parts and aggregates are planned for manufacture
 Vignyan Industries, a subsidiary located at Tarikere (around 300 km from Bengaluru) - steel castings

Management
Shri M V Rajasekhar has been the CMD of BEML Ltd since 1 Feb 2021 after the superannuation of Dr D K Hota the predecessor CMD.

Competitors 
The main competitor for BEML is in the private sector who has its own manufacturing units in India, thus participating in the 'Make in India' initiative.

 Alstom which has a new facilities at Sricity, Savli and in Bihar.

Defense Vehicles

BEML manufactures DRDO designed HMV, Arjun ARRV, MSCPV and Czech Tatra trucks and rebadges them under license.

 BEML - TATRA T810 VVNC 6x6
 BEML - TATRA T810 VVL 6x6
 BEML - TATRA T810 VTI 6x6 - Tank Transporter
 BEML - TATRA T815 VVNC 8x8
 BEML - TATRA T815 VVL 8x8
 BEML - TATRA T815 VTI 8x8 - Tank Transporter
 BEML - TATRA Crash Fire Tender
 BEML - TATRA T816 6MWR 8T 10x10
 BEML - TATRA T815 27ET96 28 300 8x8
 BEML - TATRA T815 26RR36 22 255 6x6
 BEML - TATRA T158 PHOENIX VTI 6x6 - Tank Transporter
 BEML - TATRA PHOENIX 8x8, 6x6, 4x4
 BEML - TATRA FORCE 10x10, 8x8, 6x6, 4x4
 BEML - TATRA TERRN°2 10x10, 8x8, 6x6, 4x4
 BEML - TATRA TACTIC 6x6
 BEML Armored Vehicle Arjun ARRV

A probe into an alleged scam in the purchase of Tatra trucks for the Indian Army led to the suspension of the then-BEML chief by the Defence Ministry.

Trailers 

 20T (20Ton pay load, 8 Wheeled)
 50T (50Ton pay load, 12 Wheeled)
 70T (70Ton pay load, 40 Wheeled)

References

External links 

Coach and wagon manufacturers of India
Manufacturing companies based in Bangalore
Construction equipment manufacturers of India
Government-owned companies of India
Defence companies of India
Truck manufacturers of India
Indian brands
1964 establishments in Mysore State
Companies listed on the National Stock Exchange of India
Companies listed on the Bombay Stock Exchange